Poseidium or Poseidion was a town on the northeast coast of ancient Euboea. It belonged to the Delian League since it appears in the taxation registry of Athens of the year 425/4 BCE, where it had to pay a phoros of 100 drachmae. In the 2nd century BCE, Poseidium appears in another inscription where it had become a deme of Oreus.

Its site is located near the Palaiokastro ("old fort/castle") of Vasilika.

References

Populated places in ancient Euboea
Former populated places in Greece
Members of the Delian League